Harsidhi Assembly constituency is an assembly constituency in Purvi Champaran district in the Indian state of Bihar. It is reserved for scheduled castes. It was an open seat earlier.

Overview
As per orders of Delimitation of Parliamentary and Assembly constituencies Order, 2008, 13. Harsidhi Assembly constituency (SC) is composed of the following:
Harsidhi and Turkaulia community development blocks.

Harsidhi Assembly constituency is part of 3. Purvi Champaran (Lok Sabha constituency). It was earlier part of Motihari (Lok Sabha constituency).

Members of Legislative Assembly

Election results

2020

2015

2010

References

External links
 

Assembly constituencies of Bihar
Politics of East Champaran district